Shyam Sunder Mahapatra was an Indian politician. He was elected to the Lok Sabha, the lower house of the Parliament of India as a member of the Indian National Congress.

He died on 22 April 2006 in New Delhi.

References

Lok Sabha members from Odisha
India MPs 1971–1977
Indian National Congress politicians from Odisha
Rajya Sabha members from Odisha
1929 births
2006 deaths